Alireza Hajghasem is an Iranian football midfielder who played for Iran in the 1964 Summer Olympics . He also played for Taj SC.

References

External links
 

People from Tehran
Iran international footballers
Iranian footballers
Esteghlal F.C. players
Pas players
1943 births
Association football midfielders
Living people